Basyral Hamidy Harahap (15 November 1940 – 9 January 2015) was an Indonesian writer and humanist of Mandailing-Angkolan descent.

Works

References 

1940 births
2015 deaths
Indonesian writers
Mandailing people
People from Mandailing Natal Regency